George Andrew McCluskey (born 24 June 1959) is an English singer, songwriter, musician and record producer. He is best known as the lead singer and bass guitarist of the electronic band Orchestral Manoeuvres in the Dark (OMD), which he founded alongside keyboard player Paul Humphreys in 1978. The duo have been described as "electro pioneers".

McCluskey also founded pop girl group Atomic Kitten, for whom he served as a principal songwriter, and has collaborated with various acts. His work has received nominations at the Ivor Novello, Grammy and Brit Awards, and has topped charts in the UK and internationally.

Orchestral Manoeuvres in the Dark
Andy McCluskey was born on 24 June 1959 in Heswall, Wirral, and grew up in Meols on the northern coast of the Wirral Peninsula in England. McCluskey met Paul Humphreys at Great Meols Primary School, in Elwyn Road, and played with him in several bands, including Hitlerz Underpantz, VCL XI and the Id. McCluskey then attended Calday Grange Grammar School in West Kirby. McCluskey briefly joined Dalek I Love You as their lead singer, but left because he wanted to sing his own songs. McCluskey teamed up with Humphreys again to form OMD in 1978, achieving global success. Humphreys and the rest of the band split with McCluskey in 1989, with McCluskey retaining the OMD name: he disbanded the group in 1996.

McCluskey single-handedly wrote the OMD hits "Enola Gay", which became an international no. 1 hit; "Joan of Arc"; and "Maid of Orleans", which was Germany's biggest-selling single of 1982. He also co-wrote the successful singles "Locomotion", "Talking Loud and Clear", "If You Leave", and "Sailing on the Seven Seas". Music Week said that McCluskey has an "immense talent for writing perfect pop songs", while Joy Division and New Order co-founder Peter Hook described him as "really underrated... for what he did with Orchestral Manoeuvres but also those pop songs he wrote for Atomic Kitten."

Reformation

McCluskey and Humphreys reformed OMD for a performance on German TV in June 2005, with the promise of more gigs to follow. 2007 saw the first tour of the reformed OMD, including Martin Cooper and Malcolm Holmes, commemorating the twenty-sixth anniversary of the release of their seminal album Architecture & Morality. The album itself was remastered and re-released to coincide.

The band released a CD and DVD of their Hammersmith Apollo (London) live gig from the 2007 reunion tour in the spring of 2008 before undertaking a short tour to celebrate thirty years as a band in the autumn of 2008, concluding at London's historic Roundhouse venue on 7 October 2008. A compilation of their singles and videos, Messages: Greatest Hits, was released to coincide with the tour. On 20 September 2010 Orchestral Manoeuvres in the Dark released their 11th studio album History of Modern, their first in 14 years. The band's Souvenir box set, a career retrospective covering their entire oeuvre, was nominated for "Best Historical Album" at the 2021 Grammy Awards.

Live performance
McCluskey developed a popular and distinctive onstage dance routine, dubbed by the BBC's Stuart Maconie as the "Trainee Teacher Dance". Rock trio ZZ Top, who shared a studio with OMD on a 1980 edition of BBC2 show The Old Grey Whistle Test, adopted the routine as part of their live set (and also played OMD's self-titled debut album over the PA prior to concerts). Maconie wrote that the "jerky, leg-snapping" dance became "the dance-floor routine of choice" for teaching students in the early-to-mid 1980s. Rolling Stone observed "the infectious manic energy of [OMD] frontman Andy McCluskey, a walking encyclopedia of New Wave dance moves". McCluskey said: "I find that it becomes part of the show. It's got to a point where I am now in a shamanistic shaking ritual. I just get physically involved." He explained the genesis of his "legendary" dancing in the Scotsman, saying that it stemmed "from the perception that we were making boring robotic intellectual music that you couldn't dance to. I was trying to say, 'No, no, you can dance to it, look, I'm dancing to it - there's energy, passion'.

In live shows, McCluskey often plays bass guitar and occasionally, keyboard instruments and guitar. He is right-handed, but originally learned to play bass guitar on a left-handed model. As a result, he plays with the strings "upside down" (i.e., with the lowest-pitched string on the bottom and the highest-pitched one on top), counter to normal practice.

Atomic Kitten and the Genie Queen
In 1998, McCluskey founded the UK pop group Atomic Kitten. Their song "Whole Again", co-written by McCluskey, was his first no. 1 song on the UK Singles Chart, and he and his fellow songwriters were nominated for the Ivor Novello Award for "International hit of the year". The song also received a Brit Award nomination for "Best British Single". McCluskey was also a writer of the Atomic Kitten hits "Right Now", "See Ya", "I Want Your Love" and "Cradle". He parted ways with the group during the recording of their second album, Feels So Good (2002).

McCluskey subsequently formed the White Noise records and publishing label where he worked with Liverpool girl group, the Genie Queen.

Other work
McCluskey has written with, and provided session musicianship for, various artists. Some of his collaborators include: Gary Barlow, with whom McCluskey wrote the song "Thrill Me" for the soundtrack of the film Eddie the Eagle (2016); The Lightning Seeds, for whom he played keyboards on their debut album Cloudcuckooland (1990); and Karl Bartos, whose record Esperanto (1993) – released under the Elektric Music moniker – features McCluskey as co-writer on "Show Business" and "Kissing the Machine" (and as lead vocalist on the latter track). Bartos also co-wrote the song "The Moon & the Sun", which featured on OMD's Universal (1996). "Kissing the Machine" would later appear in a reworked form on the OMD album English Electric (2013). McCluskey recorded the song "A Million Stars" with members of Fun, for the soundtrack of 2015 film The D Train.

McCluskey owns the Motor Museum, a recording studio in Liverpool.

Personal life
McCluskey's father, James (1924–2003), was born in Glasgow and was a railway worker.

McCluskey's girlfriend in the late 1970s was the Id bandmate Julia Kneale. She wrote the lyrics to "Julia's Song", which appeared on OMD's eponymous debut album (1980).

McCluskey later married Toni, with whom he had two children. A prominent reason for OMD's reformation was that his children had never seen him on stage; in 2007 he said: "I was happy to stop working to be with the kids, but strangely enough they have been the most vocal in encouraging me back."

The couple divorced in 2011 and Toni returned to her native San Diego, California, with the children. Their son, James McCluskey, is a founding member, bass player and backing vocalist of the group MiG 15, named after the fighter jet of the same name.

McCluskey is a supporter of Liverpool F.C. He also acquired a fandom of Celtic F.C. through his Glaswegian father.

McCluskey is a longtime atheist.

References

External links
 
 
 

1959 births
Living people
English new wave musicians
English rock singers
English atheists
English male singer-songwriters
English record producers
British synth-pop new wave musicians
Male new wave singers
People from Heswall
Orchestral Manoeuvres in the Dark members
People educated at Calday Grange Grammar School